The 2014 World Junior Curling Championships were held from February 26 to March 5 at the Waldhaus Arena in Flims, Switzerland.

Men

Teams
The teams are listed as follows:

Round-robin standings
Final Round Robin Standings

Round-robin results

Draw 1
Wednesday, February 26, 12:00

Draw 2
Wednesday, February 26, 20:00

Draw 3
Thursday, February 27, 14:00

Draw 4
Friday, February 28, 8:00

Draw 5
Friday, February 28, 16:00

Draw 6
Saturday, March 1, 9:00

Draw 7
Saturday, March 1, 19:00

Draw 8
Sunday, March 2, 12:00

Draw 9
Sunday, March 2, 20:00

Tiebreaker
Monday, March 3, 14:00

Playoffs

1 vs. 2
Tuesday, March 4, 12:00

3 vs. 4
Tuesday, March 4, 12:00

Semifinal
Tuesday, March 4, 18:00

Bronze-medal game
Wednesday, March 5, 13:00

Final
Wednesday, March 5, 13:00

Women

Teams
The teams are listed as follows:

Round-robin standings
Final Round Robin Standings

Round-robin results

Draw 1
Wednesday, February 26, 8:00

Draw 2
Wednesday, February 26, 16:00

Draw 3
Thursday, February 27, 9:00

Draw 4
Thursday, February 27, 19:00

Draw 5
Friday, February 28, 12:00

Draw 6
Friday, February 28, 20:00

Draw 7
Saturday, March 1, 14:00

Draw 8
Sunday, March 2, 8:00

Draw 9
Sunday, March 2, 16:00

Tiebreaker
Monday, March 3, 14:00

Playoffs

1 vs. 2
Tuesday, March 4, 12:00

3 vs. 4
Tuesday, March 4, 12:00

Semifinal
Tuesday, March 4, 18:00

Bronze-medal game
Wednesday, March 5, 9:00

Final
Wednesday, March 5, 9:00

References

External links

Junior
2014
International curling competitions hosted by Switzerland
International sports competitions hosted by Switzerland
2014 in Swiss sport
Flims
February 2014 sports events in Europe
March 2014 sports events in Europe
2014 in youth sport